William Quinn (13 December 1884 – 12 November 1965) was a Canadian actor of stage and film, primarily of the silent era. He appeared in more than 60 films between 1914 and 1935. He was born in Canada and died in Glen Ellen, California at the age of 80.

Partial filmography

 Called Back (1911)
 Called Back (1914) - Signor Macari
 The Heart of Lincoln (1915) - The Southern Colonel
 For Cash (1915, Short) - Lee Varick - an Artist
 Under the Crescent (1915) - Said Pasha - the Khedive
 The Oyster Dredger (1915, Short) - Vera's Lawyer
 The Violin Maker (1915, Short) - Maurice Puello
 The Trust (1915, Short) - Bill
 Drugged Waters (1916) - Weary
 Love's Lariat (1916) - Allan Landers
 Is Any Girl Safe? (1916)
 The Heritage of Hate (1916) - Bradley
 The Voice on the Wire (1917) - Emil LaRoux
 Sirens of the Sea (1917) - Hartley Royce
 The Curse of Eve (1917) - Dr. Burton
 The Marriage Lie (1918) - 'Parson' Dye
 A Daughter of the West (1918) - 'Rawhide' Pete
 Winning Grandma (1918) - Luther Parrish
 The Grey Parasol (1918) - Farraday Childs
 Terror of the Range (1919)
 The Old Maid's Baby (1919) - Professor Caldwell
 The Sawdust Doll (1919) - Raynor
 The Devil's Trail (1919) - 'Dutch' Vogel
 The Arizona Cat Claw (1919) - Frank Stimpson
 The Chorus Girl's Romance (1920) - P.P. Anderson
 Occasionally Yours (1920) - Parker
 Hell's Oasis (1920) - Wolf Sims
 Skyfire (1920) - Jean Beaupre
The Kingfisher's Roost (1921) - 'Bull' Keeler
 Rangeland (1922) - Buck Kelley
 Lure of the Gold (1922) - Chuck Wallace
 The Heart of a Texan (1922) - Pete Miller
 West of the Pecos (1922) - Chuck Wallace
 The Married Flapper (1922) - 'Wild Ben' Clark
 Table Top Ranch (1922) - Palque Powell
 Wolf Law (1922) - Simon Santey
 The Fighting Strain (1923) - Jim Black
 The Tango Cavalier (1923) - Brute Morgan
 The Ghost City (1923) - Henchman (uncredited)
 The Darling of New York (1923) - Ice Malone
 His Mystery Girl (1923) - The Valet
 Those Who Dance (1924) - Minor Role (uncredited)
 The Man Who Came Back (1924) - (uncredited)
 Forbidden Paradise (1924) - (uncredited)
 The No-Gun Man (1924) - Bill Kilgore
 Idaho (1925, Serial) - Ike Rogers
 The Scarlet Brand (1927) - Bart Jackson
 My Home Town (1928) - Joey
 Gypsy of the North (1928) - Baptiste
 Law and Lawless (1932) - Pete (uncredited)
 Big Calibre (1935) - Otto Zenz - aka Gadski
 Here Comes the Band (1935) - Soldier

References

External links

1884 births
1965 deaths
Canadian male film actors
Canadian male silent film actors
20th-century Canadian male actors
Canadian expatriate male actors in the United States
Canadian expatriates in Australia